I Believe in Miracles is a 2015 film directed by Jonny Owen.

Plot
The film tells the story of football club Nottingham Forest's rise, under Brian Clough and Peter Taylor, to becoming English champions in 1978 and European champions in 1979 and 1980. The film features documentary footage of matches and interviews with many of the former Forest players who played at the time.

The film's soundtrack includes funk and soul music from the 1970s, including the song from which its title is based, featuring versions from The Jackson Sisters and Mark Capanni.

A book of the same name to accompany the release of the film was written by Daniel Taylor, chief football writer of The Guardian.

References

External links 

 

2015 films
British documentary films
Documentary films about association football
Brian Clough
Nottingham Forest F.C.
2010s English-language films
2010s British films